Maria Ivanovna Khlopova (died 1633), was a Russian noble, the fiancee of Tsar Michael I of Russia. 

Maria Ivanovna Khlopova was chosen via a brideshow to be the future bride of the tsar in 1616, and brought to live amongst the court. However, despite the Tsar’s fondness for Maria, a feud took place between her and her family and the tsar's mother, which lasted for several years. During one court function Maria vomited and collapsed, which caused whispers through the court that despite her apparent good health during the brideshow, she became frequently ill, and many suspected she had been poisoned, a common practice in the Russian court at the time. The perpetrator may have been Tsar Michael's mother because of their families' feuds, or possibly by one of the many other royal families rejected in the brideshow who wanted their daughter to be chosen as Tsarina instead. Whatever the case, Maria's illness was cited as proof of inability to bear children and she and her family were exiled to Siberia, though her father was later appointed governor of Vologda. The Tsar, who had allegedly become very close to Maria during her six-week stint as Tsarina, swore never to wed again, but at the insistence of his advisors he married Maria Dolgorukova in 1624.

References
 П. Мельников. «Мария Ивановна Хлопова, невеста царя Михаила Федоровича» ("Нижегородские Губернские Ведомости", 1845, № 7 и след.)
 Д. Мордовцев. «Русские женщины допетровской Руси»;
 И. Е. Забелин. «Домашний быт русских цариц» (глава 3-я).
 "The Romanovs: 1613-1918" by Simon Sebag Montefiore
1633 deaths
17th-century Russian people
Russian nobility
Year of birth unknown
17th-century Russian women